Below is an incomplete list of SS subcamps of Neuengamme camp system operating from 1938 until 1945. The Neuengamme concentration camp established by the SS in Hamburg, Germany, became a massive Nazi concentration camp complex using prisoner forced labour for production purposes in World War II. Some 99 SS subcamps were part of the Neuengamme camp system, with up to 106,000 inmates. The number of prisoners per location ranged from more than 5,000 to only a dozen at a work site. Beginning in 1942, inmates of Neuengamme were also transported to the camp Arbeitsdorf. "Toward the ends of the war three times more prisoners were in satellite camps than in the main camp" wrote Dr. Garbe of the Neuengamme Memorial Museum. Several of the subcamps have memorials or plaques installed, but as of 2000, there was nothing at 28 locations.

The inmates were forced to work under grueling conditions in various locations across northern Germany; often transported between subcamps and specific job sites. Due to subsequent demolition of the Neuengamme camp system by the SS in 1945 including its records, the historical work is difficult and still incomplete. For example, in 1967, the German Federal Ministry of Justice suggested that the camp operated from 1 September 1938 until 5 May 1945 and became part of the Sachsenhausen in June 1940. The Neuengamme Memorial organization (German: KZ-Gedenkstätte Neuengamme), an establishment of the Hamburg Ministry of Culture, Sports and Media, stated in 2008 that the empty camp was explored by British forces on 2 May 1945 and the last inmates were liberated in Flensburg on 10 May 1945. According to the United States Holocaust Memorial Museum, the camp was established on 13 December 1938 and liberated on 4 May 1945. Throughout World War II, millions of prisoners died in Nazi labour camps through mistreatment, disease, starvation and overwork, or were executed as unfit for labour. At Neuengamme, 1,700 people died each month in winter of 1944-1945, more than 50,000 in total.

At the main camp

Canalize of the Dove Elbe, a branch of the Elbe river: Elbekommando
Klinkerwerk (brick factory) of the DEST
Lagergärtnerei (camp plant nursery)
Tongruben (clay cavities)
Manufacturing plant of the Walther-Werke
Armament factories of Messap and Jastram

In Hamburg

Subcamps and working locations in Hamburg proper sorted by name.

Outside of Hamburg

Subcamps of Neuengamme in alphabetical order. Using the political division of Germany of the year 2000, there were at least 34 subcamps in Lower Saxony, 9 in Bremen, 9 in Schleswig-Holstein, 6 in North Rhine-Westphalia, 5 in Mecklenburg-Western Pomerania, 3 in Saxony-Anhalt, and 1 in Brandenburg. Also, four subcamps were located in Alderney, occupied Channel Islands, British Commonwealth.

Construction labor brigades
Inmates of concentration camps were centralized in construction labor brigades (German:Baubrigaden), organized by the SS, to clean up after air raids, remove unexploded ordnance devices and bombs, or recover corpses. Some of the brigades worked also at the Friesenwall—part of the Atlantic Wall at the German North Sea coast—and fortifications in German cities e.g. antitank obstacles. Other brigades were placing or repairing rails or railway stations.

Further names
Names found in some lists, probably mistake in writing or double-listings:

See also 
 Nazi concentration camp list
 The Holocaust

Notes

External links 
 http://www.kz-gedenkstaette-neuengamme.de/en/
 http://www.gedenkstaetten-uebersicht.de/en/europe/

Hamburg-related lists
Neuengamme
Neuengamme
Neuengamme concentration camp